The 1956 Eastern Michigan Hurons football team represented Eastern Michigan College (renamed Eastern Michigan University in 1959) in the Interstate Intercollegiate Athletic Conference (IIAC) during the 1956 NCAA College Division football season. In their fifth season under head coach Fred Trosko, the Hurons compiled a 4–4 record (3–3 against IIAC opponents) and outscored their opponents, 158 to 84. On October 27, 1956, the team set an IIAC scoring record with 10 touchdowns in a 65-0 victory over Eastern Illinois. Thomas O. McCormick was the team captain. McCormick also received the team's most valuable player award. Kerry Keating led the team with 417 yards of total offense, 417 rushing yards, 126 receiving yards, seven touchdowns, and 42 points scored. Herman Carroll led in passing with 413 passing yards.

Schedule

References

Eastern Michigan
Eastern Michigan Eagles football seasons
Eastern Michigan Hurons football